Anna Crilly is an English actress and comedian.

Education

Crilly was educated at Kent College, Pembury and attended Middlesex University, where she studied performing arts.

Career
She was a finalist in the "So You Think You're Funny" competition at the Gilded Balloon in 2003 and performed two shows at the Edinburgh Festival Fringe in the following year.
 In 2004, she was placed at the Funny Women Awards. From 2006 to 2011 she played the role of Magda, an Eastern European housekeeper, in the BBC sitcom Lead Balloon. Her deadpan performance has been described as "scene-stealing". In 2013 she and regular comedy partner Katy Wix began starring in their own sketch show Anna and Katy on Channel 4, having originated the show as a Comedy Lab episode the previous year.

She stars in the BBC children's comedy series, Sorry I've Got No Head, alongside William Andrews, James Bachman, Marcus Brigstocke, Mel Giedroyc, Marek Larwood and Nick Mohammed.
In December 2008 Crilly was nominated for a British Comedy Award as Best Female Newcomer for her portrayal of Magda in Lead Balloon, but lost out to Katy Brand. In 2007 she appeared in episode 78, "Susan of Troy", of My Family as an assistant on The Weakest Link. She also appeared as "woman" in Ricky Gervais' comedy Extras as an extra herself (series 2, episode 5). She has also starred in Pixelface, a comedy for children, as a waitress zombie slayer called Claire Parker.

In 2011, she appeared in an episode of the sitcom Not Going Out, playing the role of a drug misuse counsellor. The same year she had a guest role on the radio series Cabin Pressure as Linda Fairburn.

Crilly plays the lead role as "Coma Girl" in Channel 4's Comedy Showcase, again alongside Katy Wix. She and Wix also appeared together in the Harvey's Furniture Store sponsorship bumpers for Coronation Street until the sponsorship deal ended in 2012.

She plays Mel Gatwick in Tom Basden's sitcom Party for BBC Radio 4.

On 22 June 2012, she played Gertrude Wermers in the third episode of BBC series Dead Boss.

In 2016, she appeared in an episode of BBC Three's comedy series Witless.

In 2017, she appeared in Death in Paradise episode "Man Overboard".

Filmography

TV

Personal life
Crilly is married to British comedian William Andrews. Crilly's brother is journalist and author Robert Crilly.

References

External links

Living people
Alumni of Middlesex University
English stand-up comedians
English television actresses
English women comedians
People educated at Kent College, Pembury
People from Pembury
Actresses from Kent
Year of birth missing (living people)